Hélas pour moi (English: Alas for Me or Oh Woe Is Me) is a 1993 French film directed by Jean-Luc Godard and starring Gérard Depardieu. This film is inspired by the legend of Alcmene and Amphitryon and attempts to show the desire of a god to experience the truth of human desire, suffering and pleasure.

Plot
Abraham Klimt arrives in a small Swiss village to investigate an incident that occurred on July 23, 1989 involving Rachel and Simon Donnadieu, a local couple. He interviews several of the townsfolk and enlists the aid of a poet, Aude Amiel. In flashback, the story of Rachel and Simon unfolds. Per the Greek myth on which the film is based, God, or a god, comes to earth with his assistant, Max Mercury. He decides he wants to possess Rachel Donnadieu, so he takes the form of Simon Donnadieu when Simon leaves home on a business trip. God-as-Simon returns to Rachel while Simon is away, and the two have an encounter.

Or not. Rachel is not talking about the incident, and Simon, in a brief encounter with Klimt at the end of the film, denies that it happened. The evidence provided by the flashbacks is contradictory. Ultimately, Klimt concludes, "There is nothing left to say concerning Simon and Rachel. The rest occurs beyond images and beyond stories."

Cast
Gérard Depardieu as Simon Donnadieu
Laurence Masliah as Rachel Donnadieu 
Bernard Verley as Abraham Klimt
Aude Amiot as Aude Amiel
Roland Blanche as The drawing teacher
Jean-Louis Loca as Max Mercury
Louis-Do de Lencquesaing as Ludovic
Fabienne Chaudat

Background
Cinematographer Caroline Champetier said that the original scenario began with God riding a train through France and Switzerland, observing all the battles of humanity through the window. This sequence required expensive special effects and Godard finally gave up on the idea after visiting a company that demonstrated for him the effects they achieved for Jean-Pierre Jeunet's Delicatessen.

References

External links

French fantasy comedy-drama films
Films directed by Jean-Luc Godard
1993 films
1990s French-language films
1990s French films